Dante Garro  (†, Mendoza 13 November 2008) was an Argentine football player and manager.

Club career
Garro was a midfielder who began his career with Independiente Rivadavia in the Primera División Argentina. He made his debut against Estudiantes de La Plata in 1967, and he played 11 seasons in Argentine football.

Personal
Garro died 13 November 2008.

References

2008 deaths
Argentine footballers
Independiente Rivadavia footballers
Club Atlético Atlanta footballers
Argentine football managers
Godoy Cruz Antonio Tomba managers
1951 births
Association football midfielders
Sportspeople from Mendoza, Argentina